Quercitrin is a glycoside formed from the flavonoid quercetin and the deoxy sugar rhamnose.

Austrian chemist Heinrich Hlasiwetz (1825-1875) is remembered for his chemical analysis of quercitrin.

Occurrence 
Quercitrin is a constituent of the dye quercitron. It can be found in Tartary buckwheat (Fagopyrum tataricum) and in oaks species like the North American white oak (Quercus alba) and English oak (Quercus robur). It is also found in Nymphaea odorata or Taxillus kaempferi.

Metabolism 
The enzyme quercitrinase catalyzes the chemical reaction between quercitrin and H2O to yield L-rhamnose and quercetin.

References 

Quercetin glycosides
Flavonol rhamnosides

Audah, K.A.; Ettin, J.; Darmadi, J.; Azizah, N.N.; Anisa, A.S.; Hermawan, T.D.F.; Tjampakasari, C.R.; Heryanto, R.; Ismail, I.S.; Batubara, I. Indonesian Mangrove Sonneratia caseolaris Leaves Ethanol Extract Is a Potential Super Antioxidant and Anti Methicillin-Resistant Staphylococcus aureus Drug. Molecules 2022, 27, 8369. https://doi.org/10.3390/molecules27238369